David Heyman (born 1961) is an English film producer.

David Heyman may also refer to:
 David M. Heyman (1891–1984), American financier, health services leader, philanthropist, and art collector

See also
 David Hayman (disambiguation)
 David Heymann (disambiguation)